Robert Fisher (ca. 1465–1535) was an English politician.

He was a Member of Parliament (MP) for Rochester in 1529.

References

1465 births
1535 deaths
English MPs 1529–1536